The 1987 Pau Grand Prix was a Formula 3000 motor race held on 8 June 1987 at the Pau circuit, in Pau, Pyrénées-Atlantiques, France.

Entry list

Classification

Qualifying

Race

References

Pau Grand Prix
1987 in French motorsport